Berlin lebt 2 ("Berlin Is Alive 2") is the first collaborative studio album by German rappers Capital Bra and Samra. It was released on 4 October 2019 through Bra Music and Urban. The album serves as a continuation of Capital Bra's fourth studio album Berlin lebt (2018).

The album was preceded by five singles, four of which debuted at number one in Germany. The fifth single "110" became Capital Bra's eighteenth and Samra's tenth number-one single in Germany. Additionally, the rappers reached number one in Germany for the sixth time as a duo. The sixth and final single "Berlin lebt wie nie zuvor" was released alongside the album.

Background
On 8 May 2019, only four weeks after the release of his sixth studio album CB6, Capital Bra announced the collaborative project with Samra. The official release date was announced on 20 June 2019. Subsequently, the release of Samra's debut studio album Smoking Kill was pushed back to 2020. He renamed his album to "Jibrail und Iblis". The first single "Tilidin" was released on 21 June 2019 and reached number one in all of the German-speaking countries. Over the course of the next three months, the track was followed up by the release of the singles "Zombie", "Nummer 1", "Huracan" and "110". During an Instagram livestream on 10 July 2019, Capital Bra announced that works on the album have been finished. The cover art was revealed in August 2019. On 13 August 2019, two months before release, it was reported that all of the box sets accompanying the release of the album were sold out.

Promotion
Both rappers embarked on the Berlin lebt 2 tour starting on 28 April 2020.

Track listing

Charts

Weekly charts

Year-end charts

Certifications

Release history

References

2019 albums
Capital Bra albums
German-language albums
Collaborative albums
Sequel albums